"We Can't Love Like This Anymore" is a song written by Wendell Mobley and John Jarrard, and recorded by American country music group Alabama.  It was released in August 1994 as the first single from their compilation album Greatest Hits Vol. III.  The song reached number 6 on the Billboard Hot Country Singles & Tracks chart in December 1994.

Chart performance

References

1994 singles
Alabama (American band) songs
Song recordings produced by Garth Fundis
RCA Records Nashville singles
Songs written by Wendell Mobley
Songs written by John Jarrard
1994 songs